The Yitong River is a river in Jilin Province.  It is the mother river of Changchun, the capital of Jilin Province.

General

The Yitong River starts in Yitong Manchu Autonomous County, flows north through Changchun and Dehui cities, and flows into the Yinma River, one of the branch rivers of the Songhua River.  It is 342 kilometers long and has a total drainage area of 8,440 square kilometers.

During the Southern and Northern Dynasties in the Chinese history, Buyeo Kingdom built a castle along the Yitong.

References

Rivers of Jilin